Newgale is a village with an almost  stretch of beach in the parish of Roch, Pembrokeshire, West Wales. The beach is situated in the Pembrokeshire Coast National Park and on the Pembrokeshire Coast Path and has rugged coastal scenery with the path winding up and down the cliffs.

Newgale is one of over 40 Welsh Blue Flag beaches, which means it has the top certification for quality, cleanliness and facilities.

Village and beach
The beach is backed by a large pebble bank which was created by a major storm on 25 October 1859, and which acts as a sea defence or storm beach; however, it is often breached, and rocks are washed onto the main road. In the January 2014 storms the sea washed the pebble wall across the road and a large wave washed the early evening Richards Bros bus into the adjoining field. Newgale is popular with holiday makers, windsurfers, surfers and canoeists throughout the summer months.

There are two caravan parks, a camping site, some shops and a pub, The Duke of Edinburgh Inn. The surf at Newgale is good for beginners, with the waves usually backing off a bit even on large swell. Surfing is best on the rising tide.

The beach is a favourite place for the local people, who promenade on Boxing Day every year.

Many campers on lower ground experience flooding during rain in the summer months.

Newgale, along with Abereiddi, appeared in the music video "Delerium – Silence" (featuring Sarah McLachlan) 2000.

Newgale marks the boundary between English and Welsh-speaking Pembrokeshire, with the next beach north of Newgale being called Pen-y-Cwm. A physical example of the boundary is Brandy Brook which runs through Newgale, splitting the English-speaking South Pembrokeshire and the Welsh-speaking North Pembrokeshire, remarked upon by Richard Fenton in his Historical Tour of 1810.

References

External links 
Pembrokeshire County Council – Blue Flag Beaches – Newgale
Photographs of Newgale and surrounding area on Geograph

Beaches of Pembrokeshire
Coast of Pembrokeshire
Villages in Pembrokeshire
Surfing locations in Wales